Kerstin Margareta Lundgren (born 1955) is a Swedish Centre Party politician. She has been a member of the Riksdag since 2002 she is taking up seat number 2 for Stockholm County's constituancy. Since the September 24, 2018, Speaker of the Riksdag election, Lundgren was elected as third deputy speaker and serving as the current Third Deputy Speaker of the Riksdag. She is also a member of the AWEPA Governing Council.

Political career
In the Swedish parliament, Lundgren has been serving on the Constitution Committee from 2002 to 2006, on Foreign Affairs since 2006. She is also a member of the War-delegation since 2018. She is currently the foreign policy spokesperson of the Centre Party.

In addition to her role in parliament, Lundgren has been serving as a member of the Swedish delegation to the Parliamentary Assembly of the Council of Europe since 2007. As a member of the Centre Party, she is part of the Alliance of Liberals and Democrats for Europe group. She is currently the vice-chairwoman of the Assembly's Sub-Committee on the Middle East and the Arab World; a member of the Committee on Legal Affairs and Human Rights; and a member of the Committee on the Honouring of Obligations and Commitments by Member States of the Council of Europe (Monitoring Committee). Alongside Boris Tsilevitch of Latvia (2015-2017) and later Titus Corlățean of Romania (since 2018), she serves as the Assembly's co-rapporteur on Georgia. Prior to that mandate, she was the rapporteur on the impact of the Lisbon Treaty on the Council of Europe.

In 2020, Lundgren joined the Inter-Parliamentary Alliance on China.

References

External links

Kerstin Lundgren at the Riksdag website

1955 births
21st-century Swedish women politicians
Living people
Members of the Riksdag 2002–2006
Members of the Riksdag 2006–2010
Members of the Riksdag 2010–2014
Members of the Riksdag 2014–2018
Members of the Riksdag 2018–2022
Members of the Riksdag 2022–2026
Members of the Riksdag from the Centre Party (Sweden)
Women members of the Riksdag